Roberto Battiti (born 1961) is an Italian computer scientist, Professor of computer science at the University of Trento, director of the LIONlab (Learning and Intelligent Optimization), and deputy director of the DISI Department (Information Engineering and Computer Science) and delegate for technology transfer.

Biography 
Battiti received the Laurea degree in Physics from the University of Trento in 1985, and the Ph.D. in Computation and Neural Systems from the California Institute of Technology in 1990 under supervision of Geoffrey C. Fox.

His main research interests are heuristic algorithms for problem-solving, in particular Reactive Search Optimization, which aims at embodying solvers with internal machine learning techniques, data mining and visualization.

Battiti was elected Fellow of the Institute of Electrical and Electronics Engineers in 2009, in recognition of his "contributions to machine learning techniques for intelligent optimization and neural networks", is author of highly cited publications.

He wrote the books The LION way. Machine Learning plus Intelligent Optimization.   and Reactive Business Intelligence. From Data to Models to Insight. (with Mauro Brunato),
about integrating data mining, modeling, optimization and interactive visualization, into an end-to-end discovery and continuous innovation process powered by human and automated learning. His ideas form the basis of the Grapheur and LIONsolver software.

See also
Grapheur
LIONsolver
Reactive search optimization
Reactive business intelligence

Selected publications

Articles, a selection:

References

Fellow Members of the IEEE
Living people
Academic staff of the University of Trento
1961 births